Venkatachalapuram (வெங்கடாசலபுரம் in Tamil) is a small village situated in Theni District, Tamil Nadu, India and with direct road connectivity to Theni and Odaipatti.

Educational System 
There are two schools in the village: Sri V. V. Elementary School and Sri V. V. Higher Secondary School. The elementary school serves grades 1-5 and is near the village bus stand and Kaliamman Temple. The higher secondary school serves grades 6-12 and is located at the southwest corner of the village. Both schools teach in Tamil, and it has been proposed to start English education from 6th grade, beginning in the 2019-2020 academic year.

The village has one branch library near Sri V. V. Higher Secondary School's north entrance.

Religion 

The village has a famous temple named Sri Kaliamman Thirukovil (ஸ்ரீ காளியம்மன் திருகோவில் in Tamil). The temple is situated at the village bus stop near the elementary school. The presiding deity of the temple is Kaliamman (a form of the Hindu goddess Durga). The annual festival for this deity is held every year in the Tamil month of Panguni (பங்குனி), which falls approximately between mid-March and mid-April.

Politics 
The Venkatachalapuram village panchayat comes under Theni Panchayat Union (block). The village comes under the Bodinayakkanur state assembly constituency and the Theni Lok Sabha constituency. As per revenue administration, this village comes under Periyakulam revenue division, Theni revenue taluk, Koduvilarpatti revenue firka, and Jangalpatti revenue village. DMDK, DMK, AIADMK, and INC are the major political parties in the area.

Population 
As of India's 2011 census, the population of the village was 2,406 (1,156 male and 1,250 female). It has a scheduled caste population of 329 with no scheduled tribe population.

Language 
The language spoken is a form of Telugu dialect with most words mixed up with the Tamil language. Tamil is used for official purposes.

Reference places 
Nearest airport: Madurai Airport (IXM): 95 km away

Nearest railway station: Madurai Junction railway station (MDU): 84 km away

Nearest seaport and beach: Cochin Port (Kerala): 212 km away

Nearest police station: Veerapandi Police Station: 7.2 km away

Nearest dam: Vaigai Dam: 24 km away

Nearest falls: Suruli Falls: 46 km away

Nearest government hospital: Theni Medical College Hospital: 19 km away

Nearest subordinate court: Theni Combined Court: 18 km away

Nearest high court: Madras High Court, Madurai Bench: 94 km away

Veerapandi Gowmariamman Temple: 9.2 km away

Kammavar Sangam educational institutions: 8.3 km away

Notable Persons 
Rathika Ramasamy, the first Indian woman to achieve an international reputation as a wildlife photographer, was born in this village and later moved to New Delhi.

References

Villages in Theni district